Westlin is a surname. Notable people with this surname include:
Bonnie Westlin, American politician
Daniel Westlin (born 1980), Swedish football striker
Sven-Erik Westlin (1934–2020), Swedish weightlifter